Kʼakʼ Tiliw Chan Yopaat, previously known variously as Cauac Sky, Kawak Sky, Butsʼ Tiliw and Butzʼ Tiʼliw, was the greatest leader of the ancient Maya city-state of Quiriguá.

Reign
Kʼakʼ Tiliw Chan Yopaat ruled the city from 725 to 785 AD. The most significant event of his reign—and of Quiriguá's history—occurred in AD 738 (9.15.6.14.6 on the Mayan calendar), when his forces defeated the city of Copán. The ruler of Copán, Uaxaclajuun Ubʼaah Kʼawiil (formerly known as "18 Rabbit") was captured and later beheaded.

Before Kʼakʼ Tiliw Chan Yopaat's bold move, Quiriguá had been a vassal of Copán. The defeat of Copán led to its decline but heralded a golden age for its former dependent. For the next 38 years, stonecutters of Quiriguá created zoomorphs and stelae celebrating their legendary king. Quiriguá became a fully autonomous city which controlled the main trade route from the Caribbean to the Maya world. Meanwhile, this incident was followed by a 20-year hiatus in inscriptions at Copán, as well as the disappearance of any further mention of 18 Rabbit.

Current evidence leads to the conclusion that Kʼakʼ Tiliw Chan Yopaat died in 785 AD. There remains a stone at Quiriguá, now identified as Zoomorph G, which seems to have served as his funeral marker.

Two other rulers are known to have reigned at Quiriguá in ensuing years—Sky Xul and Jade Sky—each for about ten years. But none reached the heights achieved by their predecessor.

Notes

References

 
 
 
 

 

785 deaths
Quiriguá
680s births
Kings of Quiriguá
8th century in Guatemala